Tanadak Island is an island in the Delarof Islands subgroup of the Andreanof Islands in the Aleutian Islands chain of Alaska.
The name was registered by Captain Mikhail Tebenkov of the Imperial Russian Navy in 1852.

References

External links

Delarof Islands
Islands of Alaska
Islands of Unorganized Borough, Alaska